The Dictionnaire administratif et historique des rues de Paris et de ses monuments is a dictionary of the public streets, monuments and buildings of Paris. It was written in 1844 by Louis and Félix Lazare, employees of the prefecture of the Seine at the time of prefect Rambuteau, to whom they dedicated the work. It is a valuable source on Paris before Haussmann's redesign of the city. It aimed to provide a reference work on official acts promulgated by different regimes, which defined the legal status and characteristics of public streets in the city - official streets, streets without government authorisation, their width, course and other data. A third edition appeared in 1879, but was never finished.

Bibliography 
 Félix et Louis Lazare, Dictionnaire administratif et historique des rues et des monuments de Paris, introduction by Michel Fleury (pages IX to XIX), following the facsimile of the 2nd edition of 1855 (796 pages), Maisonneuve et Larose, 1994 
 First edition 1844
 

Books about Paris

History of Paris
1844 books